Slaughter, Texas was a ghost town in Midland County, Texas, USA.

History
The town was founded in 1882. It was named after rancher Christopher Columbus Slaughter. The town had a post office from 1907 to 1912.

References

1882 establishments in Texas
Unincorporated communities in Midland County, Texas
Ghost towns in Texas
Unincorporated communities in Texas